The Ethiopian white-footed mouse or white-footed stenocephalemys (Stenocephalemys albipes) is a species of rodent in the family Muridae. It lives in Ethiopia and Eritrea. Its natural habitats are tropical moist montane forest and  tropical high-altitude shrubland.

Description
The ears are large, rounded and scantily haired. The dorsal fur is long, sleek and glossy, sandy brown, and slightly darker brown along the spine. Individual hairs have grey bases and sandy brown shafts. The underparts are abruptly delineated from the upper parts and are pale grey, the individual hairs having darker grey bases. The limbs are short and brownish-grey, the feet having white hairs on the upper surface, except for a dark mark above the metatarsals on the hind feet. The tail is bicoloured and appears naked, being dark above and pale below.

Distribution and habitat
The Ethiopian white-footed mouse is endemic to the Ethiopian highlands where it occurs on either side of the Great Rift Valley, with a separate smaller population in the mountains in the northern part of the country, where it was studied in detail in the Degua Tembien district.

Ecology
This species is nocturnal and mainly terrestrial, although it also scrambles around in bushes. Its diet is mainly vegetable matter, including the berries of the bush plum, olive, juniper, Abyssinian rose and Rubus spp., as well as green leaves. Breeding takes place at any time of year but peaks in the wet season, from September to November. The average litter size is four. Gestation takes 23 days and weaning takes place at 24 to 29 days. Longevity for adults may be less than one year, and the population size may be controlled by predators such as owls.

Status
It has a wide range and large total population. No particular threats have been identified, so the International Union for Conservation of Nature has assessed its conservation status as of "least concern".

References

Stenocephalemys
Mammals of Ethiopia
Mammals described in 1842
Taxonomy articles created by Polbot